An Easter palm is a traditional Lithuanian and Polish symbolic decoration associated with Palm Sunday. Barbara Ogrodowska states that the ceremonial palm branch is the "most important attribute" of Palm Sunday in Poland. Communities of Polish emigrants, such as those in the United States, observe the tradition of making of Easter palms as well.

Appearance and composition
Traditionally, Easter palms are prepared on Ash Wednesday, from willow branches (with catkins). As palm trees are not indigenous to Poland, willow branches serve as symbolic substitutes for palm branches. An Easter palm may also sport some decorations, such as ribbons or dried flowers or other plants, with attributed beneficial effects.

In the early 20th century, around Vilnius (now in Lithuania, but between the wars part of Poland), decorations made to resemble palm trees began to be sold on Palm Sunday each year. It is possible that the Easter palm was originally designed by Polish interwar artist Ferdynand Ruszczyc; further historical research is needed.

In the 2011 edition of an Easter palm competition that has been held yearly since 1958, one entry reportedly topped , making it the tallest Easter palm on record.

There are many regional variations between Easter palms in Poland. In the south of the country, willow branches of various lengths are tied together, sometimes with hazel branches or wicker as well, and topped with a large flower bouquet and other decorations, including a golden cross. In the Kurpie region, the entire length of the Easter palm is often decorated with flowers. The Ethnographic Museum of Kraków holds over 200 Easter palms in its collection.

The craft of Easter palm binding is becoming endangered in Lithuania. It is a tedious and time-consuming process. It is becoming increasingly difficult to find flowers and herbs (a very large number of varieties are used in a single verba) or special dies to color them. The buyers are wary that the dried plants would cause allergic reactions and verba binders suffer from allergic reactions themselves.

Cultural significance
Easter palms are an important feature of Polish Easter celebrations. They are consecrated in a church, and subsequently paraded. Some regional customs include using the palms to sprinkle water in a house, feeding them to animals, using them as decorations for religious paintings, and burning them and using the ash in Ash Wednesday ceremonies the next year. Easter palms were said to bring about a good harvest when "planted" in a field.

As with some Christian symbols and traditions, the Easter palm's origin can be traced to pagan religions which held the willow to be endowed with beneficial qualities, and to symbolize enduring life, and rebirth. In time, the willow was adopted as a symbol by Christians in Poland.

See also
Pisanka
Święconka
Śmigus-Dyngus

References

External links

 Niedziela Palmowa i historia palmy kurpiowskie (Palm Sunday and the history of Kurpie Easter palms) 
Wileńskie palmy znane nie tylko na Wileńszczyźnie (Vilnius palms known not only in Vilnius) 

Easter traditions in Poland
Polish traditions
Christianity in Poland